Steve Harrison is a fictional police detective created by Robert E. Howard. Three stories featuring the character were published as Lord of the Dead, in 1981.

Stories
"The Black Moon"
"Fangs of Gold": First published in Strange Detective Stories, February 1934. Alternate title: People of the Serpent. Original text at Wikisource
"Graveyard Rats": First published in Thrilling Mystery, February 1936. Original text at Wikisource
"The House of Suspicion"
"Lord of the Dead": Steve faces Erlik Khan, last Emperor of the Mongols.
"The Mystery of Tannernoe Lodge"
"Names in the Black Book": First published in Strange Detective Stories, May 1934. Original text at Wikisource
"The Silver Heel"
"The Tomb's Secret": First published in Strange Detective Stories, February 1934. Alternate title: Teeth of Doom. Original text at Wikisource
"The Voice of Death"

External links
Robert E. Howard's Detective Stories

Characters in pulp fiction
Literary characters introduced in 1934
Fictional American police detectives
Fictional occult and psychic detectives
Robert E. Howard characters